The 2001–02 season was the 75th season in the existence of FC Lorient and the club's first season back in the top flight of French football. In addition to the domestic league, Lorient participated in this season's edition of the Coupe de France and the Coupe de la Ligue. The season covered the period from 1 July 2001 to 30 June 2002.

Transfers

In

Out

Competitions

Overview

French Division 1

League table

Results summary

Results by round

Matches

Coupe de France

Coupe de la Ligue

Statistics

Goalscorers

References

FC Lorient seasons
FC Lorient